Elections to Chesterfield Borough Council in Derbyshire, England were held on 2 May 2019.

Summary

Election result

|-

Ward results

Barrow Hill and New Whittington

Brimington North

Brimington South

Brockwell

Dunston

Hasland

Hollingwood and Inkersall

Holmebrook

Linacre

Loundsley Green

Lowgates and Woodthorpe

Middlecroft and Poolsbrook

Moor

Old Whittington

Rother

St. Helen's

St. Leonard's

Walton

West

By-elections

Hollingwood & Inkersall

References

2019 English local elections
May 2019 events in the United Kingdom
2019
2010s in Derbyshire